The shooting at the 2006 Commonwealth Games was held at various venues around Melbourne; the clay target shooting was held at the Melbourne Gun Club, in Lilydale.

Medal table

Clay target

Men's Trap (Singles)

Men's Trap (Pairs)

Women's Trap (Singles)

Women's Trap (Pairs)

Men's Double Trap (Singles)

Men's Double Trap (Pairs)

Women's Double Trap (Singles)

Women's Double Trap (Pairs)

Men's Skeet (Singles)

Men's Skeet (Pairs)

Women's Skeet (Singles)

Women's Skeet (Pairs)

Pistol

Men's 10m Air Pistol (Singles)

Men's 10m Air Pistol (Pairs)

Women's 10m Air Pistol (Singles)

Women's 10m Air Pistol (Pairs)

Men's 25m Rapid Fire Pistol (Singles)

Men's 25m Rapid Fire Pistol (Pairs)

Women's 25m Pistol (Singles)

Women's 25m Pistol (Pairs)

Men's 25m Centre Fire Pistol (Singles)

Men's 25m Centre Fire Pistol (Pairs)

Men's 25m Standard Pistol (Singles)

Men's 25m Standard Pistol (Pairs)

Men's 50m Pistol (Singles)

Men's 50m Pistol (Pairs)

Small Bore and Air Rifle

Men's 10m Air Rifle (Singles)

Men's 10m Air Rifle (Pairs)

Women's 10m Air Rifle (Singles)

Women's 10m Air Rifle (Pairs)

Men's 50m Rifle 3 Position (Singles)

Men's 50m Rifle 3 Position (Pairs)

Women's 50m Rifle 3 Position (Singles)

Women's 50m Rifle 3 Position (Pairs)

Men's 50m Rifle Prone (Singles)

Men's 50m Rifle Prone (Pairs)

Women's 50m Rifle Prone (Singles)

Women's 50m Rifle Prone (Pairs)

Full Bore Rifle

Male and Female Competitors (Singles)

Male and Female Competitors (Pairs)

External links 

 

2006 Commonwealth Games events
2006
Shooting sports in Australia
2006 in shooting sports
Shooting competitions in Australia